Crowning of Atlantis is the eighth album released by the symphonic metal band Therion. In the beginning it was an EP fleshed out with several covers and live tracks from Vovin Tour '98 that the record label and management insisted be placed on it to make it a full-length album.

Track listing

Credits
Christofer Johnsson – lead and rhythm guitar, keyboards, choir/vocal melodies, classic orchestra arrangements,
Tommie Eriksson – lead and rhythm guitar
Jan Kazda – bass and acoustic guitar, additional arrangements, choir and orchestra conducting
Wolf Simon – drums (except "Crowning of Atlantis")
Sami Karppinen – drums ("Crowning of Atlantis")
Waldemar Sorychta – additional guitars, solo on "Crowning of Atlantis", "Seawinds" and second solo on "Crazy Nights"

Guest musicians
Ralf Scheepers – vocals on "Crazy Nights" and "Thor"
Eileen Küpper – vocals on "Mark of Cain"
Cossima Russo – vocals on "Mark of Cain"
Angelica Märtz – vocals on "Mark of Cain"
Martina Hornbacher – vocals on "Seawinds"
Sarah Jezebel Deva – vocals on "Seawinds" and ending vocal line on "Clavicula Nox"
Jochen Bauer – solo bass vocals on "Clavicula Nox"
Jörg Braüker – solo tenor, vocals on "Clavicula Nox"

Choir
Eileen Küpper – soprano
Angelike Maertz – soprano
Anne Tributh – alto
Joerg Braeuker – bass
Jochen Bauer – bass

Indigo orchestra
Orchestration was made by Indigo Orchestra:
Heike Haushalter – violin
Petra Stalz – violin
Monika Maltek – viola
Gesa Hangen – cello

Vovin Tour '98 line-up
Christofer Johnsson – guitar & vocals
Tommy Eriksson – guitar
Kim Blomkvist – bass
Sami Karppinen – drums
Sarah Jezebel Deva – vocals
Martina Hornbacher – vocals
Cinthia Acosta Vera – vocals

Cover design
Artwork was made by Nico & Theresa.

Charts

References

External links
 
Information about the album at the official website

1999 albums
Therion (band) albums
Nuclear Blast albums